Jos Pronk (born 13 January 1983 in Warmenhuizen, North Holland) is a Dutch former professional racing cyclist.

He grew up in a family of cyclists: Mattheus Pronk was his father, Matthé Pronk is his brother and Bas Giling is his cousin.

Major results

2002
 1st  Scratch, UEC European Under-23 Track Championships
2003
 1st  Madison, National Track Championships (with Matthé Pronk)
 3rd  Points race, UCI Track World Championships
 3rd Road race, National Under-23 Road Championships
2005
 1st ZLM Tour
 1st Gent–Staden
 5th Overall Olympia's Tour
1st Stage 5 (ITT)
 9th Grand Prix de la Ville de Lillers
2006
 1st  Derny, National Track Championships
 1st Grand Prix de la Ville de Nogent-sur-Oise
 2nd Ronde van Midden-Nederland
2007
 1st Stage 3 Olympia's Tour
 1st Stage 2 Tour de Bretagne
 5th Time trial, National Road Championships
 8th Ronde van Drenthe
2008
 3rd Overall Tour du Loir-et-Cher
1st Stages 1 & 5
 3rd Duo Normand
 4th Ronde van Noord-Holland
 5th Road race, National Road Championships
 6th Overall Olympia's Tour
1st Stage 5
2009
 8th Omloop van het Waasland
2011
 1st Omloop der Kempen

References

External links

1983 births
Living people
People from Harenkarspel
Dutch male cyclists
Dutch track cyclists
Cyclists from North Holland
20th-century Dutch people
21st-century Dutch people